Tetrabutylammonium is a quaternary ammonium cation with the formula , also denoted  (where Bu = butyl group). It is used in the research laboratory to prepare lipophilic salts of inorganic anions. Relative to tetraethylammonium derivatives, tetrabutylammonium salts are more lipophilic but crystallize less readily.

Derivatives
Some tetrabutylammonium salts of simple anions include:
tetrabutylammonium fluoride, a desilylation reagent.
tetrabutylammonium bromide, a precursor to other tetrabutylammonium salts via salt metathesis reactions.
tetrabutylammonium iodide, a low cost catalyst.
tetrabutylammonium triiodide, a common carrier of the triiodide anion used in chemical synthesis.
tetrabutylammonium hydroxide, a precursor to other tetrabutylammonium salts via acid-base reactions.
tetrabutylammonium hexafluorophosphate, an electrolyte for nonaqueous electrochemistry.
Some tetrabutylammonium salts of more complex examples include:
polyoxometalates.
NS.
metal carbonyl anions.
Synthetic iron-sulfur clusters such as 
Octachlorodirhenate.

See also
 N-Butyllithium

References

Reagents for organic chemistry
Quaternary ammonium compounds
Cations